East Africa Time, or EAT, is a time zone used in eastern Africa. The time zone is three hours ahead of UTC (UTC+03:00), which is the same as Moscow Time, Arabia Standard Time, Further-eastern European Time and Eastern European Summer Time. 

As this time zone is predominantly in the equatorial region, there is no significant change in day length throughout the year and so daylight saving time is not observed.

East Africa Time is observed by the following countries:

See also
Moscow Time, an equivalent time zone covering Belarus, Turkey and most of European Russia, also at UTC+03:00
Arabia Standard Time, an equivalent time zone covering Bahrain, Iraq, Kuwait, Qatar, Saudi Arabia and Yemen, also at UTC+03:00
Eastern European Summer Time, an equivalent time zone covering European and Middle Eastern countries during daylight saving, also at UTC+03:00
Israel Summer Time, an equivalent time zone covering the State of Israel during daylight saving, also at UTC+03:00
Further-eastern European Time, an equivalent time zone covering extended Eastern European countries, also at UTC+03:00

References

Time zone
Time zones
Time in Africa